Martin Sigmund (born 19 July 1982) is a retired Czech football player who played in the Czech First League for FK Teplice.

References

External links
 
 

1982 births
Living people
Czech footballers
Czech Republic under-21 international footballers
Association football midfielders
Czech First League players
FK Teplice players
FK Ústí nad Labem players
FK Baník Most players